Johanna Nyman (born 30 April 1995) is a Swedish footballer who plays for Umeå IK.

External links 
 

1995 births
Living people
Swedish women's footballers
Umeå IK players
Damallsvenskan players
Women's association football defenders